The World Canals Conference (WCC) is an annual conference about canals and other waterways worldwide. The first conference took place in 1988, and the 2019 conference was the thirty-second. People with an interest in canals gather together to learn more about them, to exchange views, and to enjoy and celebrate successful canal restoration projects.

The organisation has undergone some name changes. The conference in 1988 was known as the "First National Conference on Historic Canals". In 1990, the "national" gave way to the "International Conference on Historic Canals", and in 1996 it became the World Canals Conference.

Attendees 

The conferences are attended by large numbers of canal professionals, tourism experts and academics, as well as many canal enthusiasts and boaters, from all over the world. Their particular concerns and interests include:

 preservation
 restoration
 urban and rural economic regeneration
 sustainable development
 ways of attracting tourists
 education and interpretation
 involvement of volunteers and the community

The Conference programme duly addresses these interests by providing a varied lecture programme and relevant excursions to local canal projects.

The prospectus of the 2007 Conference in Liverpool (see external link below) offers not only lectures, including on the Anderton Boat Lift, the Tate Liverpool canal warehouse conversion to a museum, the Liverpool Canal Link and the Roubaix Canal, but also local excursions and site visits, e.g. Manchester's Castlefield canals, Stalybridge on the Huddersfield Narrow Canal, and the Barton Swing Aqueduct on the Manchester Ship Canal.

Further afield, there were trips to the Pontcysyllte Aqueduct, the Chirk Aqueduct, the Llangollen Canal and the Montgomery Canal restoration project.

Year, location and theme 
1988 Illinois & Michigan Canal
1989 Delaware Canal
1990 Rideau Canal, National Historic Site of Canada
1991 Ohio & Erie Canal, a National Heritage Corridor in the US
1992 Chesapeake & Ohio Canal, a National Historic Park in the US
1993 Shubenacadie Canal, Dartmouth, Nova Scotia, Canada
1994 Trent-Severn Waterway, Peterborough, Ontario, Canada
1995 Augusta Canal, a National Heritage Area
1996 Birmingham, England, United Kingdom
1997 Blackstone River Valley, a National Heritage Corridor in the US
1998 Illinois & Michigan Canal
1999 Lille, France and La Louvière, Belgium
2000 New York State Canal System, Rochester, NY
2001 Dublin, Republic of Ireland, and Belfast, Northern Ireland, United Kingdom
2002 Montreal, Quebec, Canada
2003 Scottish canals, Scotland, United Kingdom
2004 Welland Canal, St Catharines, Ontario, Canada
2005 Sweden Theme: "Six Canals in Six Days"
2006 Bethlehem, Pennsylvania, US Theme: "Industry to recreation: Greening the Coal Canals"
2007 Liverpool, England, United Kingdom
2008 Rideau Canal, Kingston, Ontario, Canada - Theme: "Managing Canal Corridors in the 21st Century"
2009 Novi Sad, Serbia
2010 Rochester, New York
2011 Groningen, the Netherlands
2012 Granal Canal, China
2013 Canal du Midi, Toulouse, France
2014 Milan, Italy
2015 Ghent, Belgium
2016 Inverness, Scotland
2017 Syracuse, NY, USA
2018 Athlone, Ireland
2019 Yangzhou, Jiangsu, China

External links
 [http://www.inlandwaterwaysinternational.org/world-canals-conference

World Canals Conferences 1999, 2001, 2003, 2005, 2007
 Towpath Topics - Report on 1999 Conference in Lille and La Louvière
 PDF document on 2001 WCC Ireland
 Report in WCC 2003 by Scottish Government
 Clippings from the 2003 WCC in Ontario
 WCC 2005 Sweden website
 Report by IWA on the 2007 WCC at Liverpool
 Prospectus of the 2007 WCC at Liverpool

World Canals Conference 2008
 Official website of The World Canals Conference 2008 in Canada (Colloque international sur les canaux 2008)
 WCC 2008 slides and talks
 Site of the Rideau Canal National Historic Site of Canada

World Canals Conference 2009 in Serbia
 

World Canals Conference 2010 in New York State
 WCC 2010 website, Rochester, NY

Canals
Waterways